The following is a list of the 118 municipalities (comuni) of the Province of Asti, Piedmont, Italy.

See also 
List of municipalities of Italy

References 

Asti